Greatest Hits is the second compilation album by American country music artist Rodney Crowell. Released in 1993 (see 1993 in country music), It was his first greatest hits compilation for Columbia Records. It covers Crowell's most successful period from 1988's Diamonds & Dirt to 1992's Life Is Messy. It failed to chart on the Billboard Top Country Albums chart. One of three newly recorded tracks, "Even Cowgirls Get the Blues" was released as a single but failed to chart on the Hot Country Songs chart.

Track listing
All songs composed by Rodney Crowell except when noted
"Lovin' All Night" – 3:46
"Even Cowgirls Get the Blues" – 4:03A
"What Kind of Love" (Crowell, Will Jennings, Roy Orbison) – 3:55
"I Couldn't Leave You If I Tried" – 3:16
"After All This Time" – 4:26
"Talking to a Stranger" (Crowell, Keith Sykes) – 3:03A
"She's Crazy for Leavin'" (Crowell, Guy Clark) – 3:14
"Many a Long & Lonesome Highway" (Crowell, Jennings) – 4:15
"If Looks Could Kill" – 3:25
"It's Such a Small World" – 3:22
duet with Rosanne Cash
"Things I Wish I'd Said" – 4:09
"Standing on a Rock" – 3:04A

A Previously Unreleased

Sources

CMT
Allmusic (see infobox)
AOL Music profile

Rodney Crowell albums
1993 greatest hits albums
albums produced by Tony Brown (record producer)
albums produced by Rodney Crowell
albums produced by Larry Klein
Columbia Records compilation albums